Episimus is a genus of moths belonging to the subfamily Olethreutinae of the family Tortricidae.

Species
Episimus argutana (Clemens, 1860)
Episimus atrorufana (Walker, 1863)
Episimus augmentana (Zeller, 1877)
Episimus brunneomarginatus (Razowski & Wojtusiak, 2006)
Episimus burserae Heppner, 1994
Episimus caveata (Meyrick, 1912)
Episimus condensatana (Zeller, 1877)
Episimus cyanitis Meyrick, 1932
Episimus descriptana (Walker, 1863)
Episimus digna (Meyrick, 1917)
Episimus guiana (Busck, 1913)
Episimus kimballi Heppner, 1994
Episimus lagunculariae Heppner, 1994
Episimus ligneana (Felder & Rogenhofer, 1875)
Episimus lupata (Meyrick, 1912)
Episimus mahaiana (Felder & Rogenhofer, 1875)
Episimus mesotricha (Meyrick, 1927)
Episimus metaspilana (Walker, 1863)
Episimus nesiotes Walsingham, 1897
Episimus ortygia (Meyrick, 1917)
Episimus phaedra (Meyrick, 1931)
Episimus prudens (Meyrick, 1917)
Episimus religiosa (Meyrick, 1917)
Episimus selectana (Walker, 1863)
Episimus selenosema Diakonoff, 1963
Episimus semicirculana (Walker, 1863)
Episimus silvaticus Razowski & Wojtusiak, 2008
Episimus strigulana (Walker, 1863)
Episimus terminana (Walker, 1863)
Episimus transferrana (Walker, 1863)
Episimus tyrius Heinrich, 1923
Episimus unguiculus Clarke, 1951
Episimus utilis Zimmerman, 1978
Episimus vermiculata (Meyrick, 1912)
Episimus vittata (Walsingham, 1914)

See also
List of Tortricidae genera

References

External links
tortricidae.com

Olethreutini
Tortricidae genera